Carlo Tocco was the name of several members of the medieval and modern Italian Tocco family. It may refer to:

 Carlo I Tocco (1374/1377–1429), Despot of Epirus
 Carlo II Tocco (?–1448), Despot of Epirus
 Carlo III Tocco (1464–1518), Titular Despot of Epirus
 Carlo de Tocco (1592–1674), Prince of Montemiletto, grandson of Leonardo IV Tocco
 Carlo Antonio Tocco (1668–1701), Prince of Montemiletto, Titular Prince of Achaea
 Carlo II di Tocco Cantelmo Stuart (1756–1823), Prince of Montemiletto, Titular Prince of Achaea
 Carlo III di Tocco Cantelmo Stuart (1827–1884), Prince of Montemiletto, Titular Prince of Achaea